Xiang Yanmei (born 13 June 1992 in Baojing, Hunan) is a Chinese weightlifter. She won a gold medal at the 2016 Summer Olympics in the Women's 69 kg category.

In 2015 Xiang was nominated for CCTV's best female athlete of the year award.

References

1992 births
Living people

Weightlifters at the 2016 Summer Olympics
Olympic weightlifters of China
Olympic medalists in weightlifting
2016 Olympic gold medalists for China

World Weightlifting Championships medalists
Chinese female weightlifters
Weightlifters at the 2014 Asian Games
Asian Games medalists in weightlifting

Asian Games gold medalists for China
People from Xiangxi
Weightlifters from Hunan

Medalists at the 2014 Asian Games
20th-century Chinese women
21st-century Chinese women